Salt is the debut studio album by Australian singer-songwriter Angie McMahon. The album was released in July 2019. The album will be supported by an national tour in October 2019.

At the ARIA Music Awards of 2019, the album was nominated for Best Independent Release. At the Music Victoria Awards 2019, the album was nominated for Best Album. At the AIR Awards of 2020, the album won Best Independent Rock Album or EP.

Critical reception

Salt was named Album of the Year by Beat Magazine. Reviewer Eddy Lim said, "While Salt is primarily driven by deft guitar work and a tight rhythm section, it's McMahon's stunning vocal performance that unequivocally captures the spotlight," adding, "Her stunning vocal range takes notes from K.D. Lang, Florence Welch and Lucy Rose with a timbre that sporadically oscillates between husky intimacy and cathartic clamour."

Dylan Marshall from The AU Review said, "Angie McMahon is a tour-de-force, an artist demanding to be listened to and heard. She is a musician second, and a human first. She's put her lived experiences into these tracks. There's a special sentiment to be gained there. Salt is an album that in ten years time will be looked back on as being pivotal in the shaping of so many artists."

Kayleigh Hughes from Consequence of Sound said, "Salt exhibits McMahon's lyrical prowess time and time again." adding "For those who are feeling lost and needing to really listen, Salt will speak loud."

Laura Stanley from Exclaim said, "The songs are anchored by McMahon's electric guitar, which she pounds or softly strums, depending on how she's feeling. Often, McMahon's songs start quietly and slowly, but steadily bloom into riotous rock tracks. At their boisterous peak, McMahon has a grand realization or admits something difficult" calling the album "a confident debut".

Track listing

Charts

Release history

References

2019 debut albums